The striped bystranka (Alburnoides taeniatus) is a fish species of family Cyprinidae. Widespread in the Central Asia in Amu-Darya, Zeravshan, Syr-Darya, and Chu River. Benthopelagic temperate freshwater fish, up to 9 cm in length.

References 

 

Alburnoides
Fish described in 1874
Freshwater fish
Fish of Central Asia